Eduard Anatoliyevich Suboch (born 11 May 1969) is a Soviet ski jumper. He competed in the normal hill event at the 1988 Winter Olympics.

References

1969 births
Living people
People from Chernogorsk
Soviet male ski jumpers
Olympic ski jumpers of the Soviet Union
Ski jumpers at the 1988 Winter Olympics
Sportspeople from Khakassia